Antonio Diodato (born 30 August 1981), known simply as Diodato, is an Italian singer-songwriter. He won the 70th edition of the Sanremo Music Festival with the song "Fai rumore" and was scheduled to represent Italy in the Eurovision Song Contest 2020 in Rotterdam, the Netherlands, before the event's cancellation due to the COVID-19 pandemic.

Biography 
Born in Aosta, he is originally from Taranto and Roman by adoption.

His first works were made in Stockholm with Swedish DJs Sebastian Ingrosso and Steve Angello. Back in Italy, he graduated from the DAMS at Roma Tre University in cinema, television and new media.

Among his most important musical influences Diodato mentioned Pink Floyd, Fabrizio De André, Luigi Tenco, Domenico Modugno and Radiohead.

Career
He has released four studio albums, "E forse sono pazzo" (LeNarcisse/Goodfellas), "A ritrovar bellezza" (LeNarcisse/RCA/SonyMusic)., "Cosa siamo diventati" and "Che vita meravigliosa".

In December 2013, he was selected to participate in the Sanremo Festival 2014 (in the "New Proposals" section) with the song "Babilonia". On February 19 and 21 2014, he performed on the stage of the Ariston Theater in Sanremo for the singing festival in which he came about second in the final classification of the section behind Rocco Hunt; he received the quality jury prize chaired by Paolo Virzì.

In 2014, he won the MTV Italian Music Awards for Best New Generation, The Deezer Band Of The Year Award and the Fabrizio de André Award, with his version of "Amore che vieni, Amore che vai", for the best reinterpretation of the work of the Genoese singer-songwriter.

In 2016, he became artistic director of the May Day concert in Taranto, together with Roy Paci and Michele Riondino.

In 2017, his third studio album "Cosa siamo diventati" was released by Carosello Records.

In 2018, he participated in the Sanremo Festival with the song "Adesso", played in tandem with the trumpeter Roy Paci, coming eighth in the final classification.

In 2019, he made his debut as an actor in the film "Un'avventura", directed by Marco Danieli.

He won the Sanremo Music Festival 2020 with the song "Fai rumore".

The song "Fai rumore" also won the "Mia Martini" Critics Award and the "Lucio Dalla" Press Room Award.

As the winner of the Festival, Diodato was also designated as the Italian representative at the Eurovision Song Contest 2020, however the event was cancelled due to the COVID-19 pandemic.

On 16 May 2020, he took part in the event Eurovision: Europe Shine a Light, performing at the Verona Arena with the song "Fai rumore" and with an acoustic version of "Nel blu, dipinto di blu", a song originally recorded by Italian singer-songwriter Domenico Modugno.

On 24 February 2020, the Municipality of Taranto awarded Diodato civic merit.

On 9 May 2020, he won the David di Donatello for the best original song with "Che vita meravigliosa", used as the soundtrack of the film The Goddess of Fortune, directed by Ferzan Özpetek; on July 6, the song also won the Nastro d'Argento (Silver Ribbon) for Best Original Song.

Discography

Albums

Singles

Awards and nominations

References

External links

 

1981 births
Living people
Italian male singer-songwriters
Place of birth missing (living people)
21st-century Italian male singers
People from Taranto
Sanremo Music Festival winners
Eurovision Song Contest entrants of 2020
Eurovision Song Contest entrants for Italy